Stigen/ Ellenö was a Swedish football club located in Stigen. The club was formed from the merger of the clubs Stigen IF and Ellenö IK.

External links
Official site 
 http://nwt.se/bengtsfors/dal-sport/2014/11/18/stigens-if-slutar-med

Football clubs in Västra Götaland County